Gumball was an American rock band formed in New York City in 1991. The original lineup consisted of Don Fleming (vocals and guitar), Eric Vermillion (vocals, bass), and Jay Spiegel (drums). In 1992, a fourth member was added, Malcolm Riviera (guitar, keyboards) who had previously played with Fleming and Spiegel in the Velvet Monkeys.

History 

After Fleming and Spiegel's group B.A.L.L. broke up in 1990, the duo briefly joined Dinosaur Jr. and released one single on the Sub Pop label. The two left Dinosaur Jr. shortly after the release of the single. Jay Spiegel approached his friend Eric Vermillion, a member of Camp Hill, PA's The Stump Wizards, about playing with the two. Vemillion agreed and subsequently quit The Stump Wizards. After less than a week's rehearsal, the new trio played its first show and Gumball was born.

The fall of 1990 found Gumball in the studio, and their first release came out shortly thereafter on the Paperhouse/Sire label in England. The release was a 12 inch EP with the songs "All the Time"/"Yellow Pants"/"Gettysburg".

Gumball soon found itself with a record deal with New York City's Caroline Records. They recorded and released the album Special Kiss and embarked on a tour with Mudhoney, Sonic Youth, and other similar American indie bands of the early 1990s.

In 1991, Gumball was approached by Columbia Records A&R man Jim Dunbar about signing to the label for a two-album contract. Soon thereafter, the deal was signed and Gumball immediately re-entered the studio and began recording their major label debut, Super Tasty. The sessions were done in Wisconsin with producer Butch Vig, who later engineered Nirvana's major label debut Nevermind.

Although Gumball recorded Super Tasty as a trio, fourth member (and longtime musical associate) Malcolm Riviera joined the band shortly after the album's release. The foursome began rehearsing and in early 1993 toured in support of the album.

After a tour of the U.S., Europe, and Japan, Gumball returned to the studio in the fall of 1993 to record their second album for Columbia, Revolution on Ice. The album was released by Columbia/Sony in 1994 and the band toured in support of it throughout that year.

Columbia exercised its option to drop Gumball from its roster after low sales from Revolution on Ice. The band released a live CD on their own label in late 1994 called Tokyo Encore, but by early 1995 the band had decided to call it quits rather than begin shopping for another label.

Band members 
Don Fleming – (guitar, vocals)
Eric Vermillion – (bass)
Jay Spiegel – (drums)
Malcolm Riviera – (keyboard, guitar)

Discography

Albums

EPs

Singles

Music videos

References

External links 
 [ Allmusic entry]
 Trouser Press entry
 Gumball's official Myspace page
 Archive of Don Fleming's production company Instant Mayhem

Musical groups established in 1990
Alternative rock groups from New York (state)
Indie rock musical groups from New York (state)
Musical groups disestablished in 1994
Musical quartets
Columbia Records artists